"Scars" is the second single released from American rock band Papa Roach's fourth album, Getting Away with Murder (2004), and was released to rock radio on November 1, 2004. The song was the 36th-most-successful single of the United States in 2005, when it climbed to  15 on the Billboard Hot 100. As with several of their other songs, Papa Roach has performed "Scars" live with Spanish lyrics.

Background

The song, according to the band's video album Papa Roach: Live & Murderous in Chicago, tells the story of Jacoby Shaddix's "Horrible night in Vegas that changed my life." During live performances before playing the song, Shaddix often talks about how "the song saved his life".

Music video
The song's video tells the story of Shaddix's girlfriend, played by Taylor Cole, who is a drunk and parties too much. One day, she gets too drunk and passes out at a party at Shaddix's house. She wakes up the following morning with a hangover, and, grabbing her coat, knocks over a candle, which lands on a mat on the floor. The mat is stained with her drink from the night before. She lights the house on fire unknowingly, and goes home. When Shaddix arrives home, his house is burnt down. The girlfriend comes back to the ruin and sees what happened and realized what she did. The band performs this song on top of the burnt remains of Shaddix's house. The video was directed by Motion Theory.

Chart performance
"Scars" was Papa Roach's first and only top-40 hit on the US Billboard Hot 100, peaking at No. 15. It reached No. 2 and No. 4 on the Billboard Modern Rock Tracks and Mainstream Rock Tracks charts, respectively, and became their first and only hit on the Billboard Mainstream Top 40, peaking at No. 7. In Canada, the song rose to No. 22 on the Radio & Records CHR/Pop Top 30 listing. It also charted in Germany, peaking at No. 82 in June 2005. In the United States, the song is certified gold for digital sales exceeding 500,000.

Track listings

Personnel
Credits are adapted from the European enhanced maxi-CD single liner notes.
 Jacoby Shaddix – words
 Jerry Horton, Tobin Esperance – music
 Howard Benson – production
 Chris Lord-Alge – mixing

Charts

Weekly charts

Year-end charts

Certifications

Release history

References

2004 songs
2005 singles
Geffen Records singles
Papa Roach songs
Song recordings produced by Howard Benson
Songs written by Jacoby Shaddix
Songs written by Tobin Esperance
Emo songs